Fiji competed with only one person at the 1968 Summer Olympics in Mexico City, Mexico. Fiji returned to the Summer Olympic Games after missing the 1964 Summer Olympics in Tokyo.

Athletics

References
Official Olympic Reports
Part Three: Results

Nations at the 1968 Summer Olympics
1968
Olympics